Idaho State Highway 11 (SH-11) is a state highway in north central Idaho. It runs  from U.S. Route 12 (US 12) near Greer, north to Forest Service Roads 246 and 247 near Headquarters.

Route description
SH-11 begins at an intersection with US 12 in Lewis County.  It heads east across the Clearwater River into Clearwater County, running through Greer, and climbs out of the Clearwater valley in a series of switchbacks. It then heads east, exiting the Nez Perce Indian Reservation, and continues to Weippe, passing a historic marker indicating the point the Lewis and Clark expedition met the Nez Perce.

SH-11 then turns northeast out of Weippe.  Shortly before entering Pierce, it passes three historical markers.  The first indicates the site of the lynching of five Chinese miners in 1885.  The second marker indicates Canal Gulch, the site of the first gold strike in Idaho.  The third marker indicates the site of the original Orofino.

SH-11 then passes through Pierce and continues generally northeast.  It ends at an intersection with National Forest Roads 246 and 247 in Headquarters.

History

The original grade at Greer was a Nez Perce trail. During the Pierce gold rush of 1861, the first wagon roadbed on the grade was built by the Walla Walla–Clearwater Road Co., under a contract with the legislature of Washington Territory. The Idaho Territory was established in March 1863.

Major intersections

See also

 List of state highways in Idaho
 List of highways numbered 11

References

External links

011
Gold rush trails and roads
Transportation in Lewis County, Idaho
Transportation in Clearwater County, Idaho
Chinese-American culture in Idaho